Ananthapalli is a village located in West Godavari District, Andhra Pradesh, India.  The village is famous for its paddy field, maize crops and sugar cane cultivation.  There is a population of around 12,412  in the village. 

Ananthapalli is the village where Yerrakaluva and Polavaram Project meets.

Villages in West Godavari district